Bola Sete at the Monterey Jazz Festival is a live album by Brazilian guitarist Bola Sete, released in 1967 through Verve Records.

Track listing

Chart positions

Personnel 

Musicians
Paulinho da Costa – drums
Sebastião Neto – bass guitar
Bola Sete – guitar

Production and additional personnel
Creed Taylor – production
Val Valentin – engineering
Acy Lehman – design

Release history

References

External links 
 

Albums produced by Creed Taylor
1967 live albums
Bola Sete live albums
Verve Records live albums
albums recorded at the Monterey Jazz Festival